Roy Walter Riehlman (August 26, 1899 – July 16, 1978) was an American businessman and member of the United States House of Representatives from New York.

Early life

R. Walter Riehlman was born in Otisco, New York on August 26, 1899. He was raised in Tully, graduated from Manlius Military Academy in 1919 and Central City Business School of Syracuse in 1921.

Start of career
Riehlman operated a general store and served as Postmaster of Nedrow from 1921 to 1923. In 1923 he returned to Tully and became owner a commercial baking company, Tully Bakery.

From 1933 to 1938, Riehlman was a member of the Tully Board of Education. In 1934 he was elected Chairman of Tully's Republican Committee. He was elected to the Onondaga County Board of Supervisors in 1937 and served from 1938 to 1943. From 1943 to 1946 he was Onondaga County Clerk.

Riehlman was also active in civic affairs and several local businesses, including serving on the advisory board of the Marine Midland Trust Company and the area board of directors of Virginia's Lynchburg College.

Congressional career

In 1946 he was elected to Congress as a Republican. He was reelected eight times and served from January 3, 1947, to January 3, 1965, the 80th through 88th Congresses. In 1952 Riehlman was one of the Republicans who visited Dwight D. Eisenhower, then commander of the North Atlantic Treaty Organization, to ask him to consider running for President. As a senior member of the Committee on Science and Technology, he was an advocate of the U.S. space program. Riehlman voted in favor of the Civil Rights Acts of 1957, 1960, and 1964, as well as the 24th Amendment to the U.S. Constitution.

Post-Congressional career
Riehlman was an unsuccessful candidate for reelection in 1964, losing his seat in that year's Johnson Landslide. He then relocated to Ormond Beach, Florida and returned to the business world, serving as vice president of Lu-Mar Enterprises, a company which owned restaurants and owned and developed commercial real estate.

Death and burial
He died in Ormond Beach, Florida on July 16, 1978. Riehlman was buried at Tully Cemetery in Tully.

References

External links

1899 births
1978 deaths
People from Otisco, New York
People from Ormond Beach, Florida
New York (state) postmasters
County legislators in New York (state)
County clerks in New York (state)
Republican Party members of the United States House of Representatives from New York (state)
People from Onondaga County, New York
People from Onondaga, New York
People from Tully, New York
20th-century American politicians